Clarence Augustus Walworth (May 30, 1820 – September 19, 1900) was an American attorney, writer, ordained Roman Catholic priest and missionary. Walworth was a well regarded writer who published numerous works related to the Roman Catholic Church.

Life
Clarence A. Walworth, the fourth child and oldest son Reuben Hyde Walworth and Maria Ketchum (Averill) Walworth, was born on May 30, 1820 at Plattsburgh, Clinton County, New York.

He was educated at The Albany Academy, and graduated from Union College in 1838. Then he studied law, was admitted to the bar, and practiced in Canandaigua.

After a few years he abandoned the law, and instead studied theology at the General Theological Seminary in New York City. Before he completed his studies there, he decided to become a Catholic priest, entered the Congregation of the Most Holy Redeemer, and continued his studies in Belgium. From 1866 to 1892 he was pastor of St. Mary's Church in Albany.

Walworth’s 1888 Andiatorocté; or, The Eve of Lady Day on Lake George and Other, Hymns, and Meditations in Verse  was reviewed by Oscar Wilde:

“Andiatoroctè [sic] is the title of a volume of poems by the Rev. Clarence Walworth, of Albany, N. Y.  It is a word borrowed from the Indians, and should, we think, be returned to them as soon as possible….Poems of this kind were popular in the Middle Ages when the cathedrals of every Christian country served as its theaters.  They are anachronisms now, and it is odd that they should come to us from the United States.  In matters of this kind we should have some protection.”

Walworth died September 19, 1900, in Albany, New York.

References

The Rev. Clarence A. Walworth Obit in NYT on September 20, 1900

External links
 

American non-fiction writers
Christian writers
1900 deaths
1820 births
Union College (New York) alumni
People from Plattsburgh, New York
Lawyers from Albany, New York
Burials at Greenridge Cemetery
Religious leaders from Albany, New York
Writers from Albany, New York
Catholics from New York (state)
The Albany Academy alumni
Writers from New York (state)
19th-century American lawyers
19th-century American Roman Catholic priests